Kameda (written: 亀田) is a Japanese surname. Notable people with the surname include:

 Daiki Kameda (born 1989), Japanese boxer
 Kōki Kameda (born 1986), Japanese boxer
 Seiji Kameda (born 1964), Japanese music producer, arranger, and guitarist
 Tomoki Kameda (born 1991), Japanese boxer

Japanese-language surnames